The Chad Baronetcy, of Thursford in the County of Norfolk, was a title in the Baronetage of Great Britain. It was created on 28 July 1791 for George Chad, Recorder of King's Lynn. Chad was one of the pallbearers at Henry Lee Warner's (died 1804) funeral, Warner was the son and heir of Tory politician, Henry Lee Warner.

The title became extinct on the death of his only surviving son, the second Baronet, in 1855.

The first Baronet was the father of English diplomat, George William Chad.

Chad baronets, of Thursford (1791)
Sir George Chad, 1st Baronet (1730–1815)
Sir Charles Chad, 2nd Baronet (1779–1855)

References

Extinct baronetcies in the Baronetage of Great Britain